Twemlow is a surname. Notable people with the surname include:

Alice Twemlow, British writer, critic, and educator
Billy Twemlow (1892–1933), English footballer

See also
Twemlow, the Cheshire parish
Twombly (disambiguation), a surname derived from Twemlow